Kimiko Jinnai (born 12 March 1964) is a Japanese badminton player, born in Yatsushiro, Kumamoto. She competed in women's doubles with team mate Hisako Mori at the 1992 Summer Olympics in Barcelona.

References

External links

1964 births
Living people
People from Yatsushiro, Kumamoto
Sportspeople from Kumamoto Prefecture
Japanese female badminton players
Olympic badminton players of Japan
Badminton players at the 1992 Summer Olympics
Asian Games medalists in badminton
Badminton players at the 1982 Asian Games
Badminton players at the 1986 Asian Games
Badminton players at the 1990 Asian Games
Asian Games silver medalists for Japan
Asian Games bronze medalists for Japan
Medalists at the 1982 Asian Games
Medalists at the 1986 Asian Games
Medalists at the 1990 Asian Games
20th-century Japanese women
21st-century Japanese women